Fasih Mahmood aka Fasih Mohammed is an alleged member of Lashkar-e-Taiba, a Pakistan-based Islamist terror group. A native of Bihar, he is accused of committing terrorist attacks and recruiting members for terror related activities. He was arrested with suspected involvement with the 2010 Chinnaswamy Stadium blast in Bangalore and a terror attack near Jama Masjid (Delhi) in 2010 and is wanted by both Delhi and Karnataka Police.

Early life
Mehmood, originally from Bihar's Madhubani district, had moved to Saudi Arabia in 2007 after obtaining his Bachelor's in technology degree. He is an engineer by training.

Militancy
Delhi Police sources claimed that Fasih Mahmood was involved with radicalizing Students Islamic Movement of India (Simi) into a deadly Indian Mujahideen (IM).

Some of the suspects of 2010 Bangalore stadium bombing were later arrested from Darbhanga, Bihar state. He was arrested in Saudi Arabia in May 2012.

References

External links
CBI likely to send team to Saudi to extradite Fasih
Fasih may be key Indian Mujahideen hand; Bihar module is the oldest

Living people
Indian Islamists
Indian Mujahideen members
Lashkar-e-Taiba members
Year of birth missing (living people)